Philip Holder (born 19 January 1952) is an English former association football player and manager. As player, he made more than 150 appearances in the Football League representing Tottenham Hotspur, Crystal Palace and AFC Bournemouth, and played in the North American Soccer League for the Memphis Rogues. As manager, he took charge of Brentford for three seasons.

Career
Holder was born in Kilburn, London. He began his football career as an apprentice with Tottenham Hotspur in 1969 and remained with the club for five years. He played only 13 times in the Football League, but played six games in European competition, including a substitute appearance in the second leg of the 1974 UEFA Cup Final. He joined Crystal Palace in February 1975, and played 112 games in all competitions for the club, before spending a summer in the North American Soccer League with the Memphis Rogues. He returned to England and signed for AFC Bournemouth of the Fourth Division in March 1979, before his playing career ended due to a pelvic injury.

Holder then took up coaching, with clubs including Crystal Palace. He was appointed assistant to Brentford manager Steve Perryman in the late 1980s, and when Perryman resigned, Holder was confirmed as his successor in September 1990 after a spell in temporary charge. He guided them to the Third Division play-offs that season, only for the team to lose to Tranmere Rovers in the semi-final over two legs. In first leg at Griffin Park, a last minute equaliser from Kevin Godfrey gave Brentford hope, but later the same week, a 1–0 defeat at Prenton Park gave Tranmere the overall tie 3–2 on aggregate.

As a coach Holder will be best remembered for his success during the 1991–92 season. He guided a Brentford side spearheaded by prolific striker Dean Holdsworth to the Third Division title and gained them a place in the new Division One. With six matches of the season left, Holder told the players that they needed to win them all: they did so. On Boxing Day 1992, Brentford went 10th in Division One and were just three points short of the playoff zone. Holder was voted Manager of the Month for the division, and there was much speculation as to whether Brentford could mount a challenge for promotion to the Premiership. But a sharp decline set in and defeat in the final game of the season condemned "The Bees" to relegation to Division Two. Holder was sacked three days later.

In July 1993 he briefly joined Watford as Perryman's assistant, then assisted Peter Taylor at Southend United, and coached at Reading, before linking up with Perryman yet again in 1999, this time in Japan as assistant manager of J.League side Shimizu S-Pulse.

Personal life 
After leaving football, Holder entered the flower business.

Honours

As a manager 
Brentford
 Football League Division Three: 1991–92

As an individual 
 Brentford Hall of Fame

References

External links
 
 NASL stats and photo at NASL Jerseys
 

1952 births
Living people
Footballers from Kilburn, London
English footballers
Association football midfielders
Tottenham Hotspur F.C. players
Crystal Palace F.C. players
Memphis Rogues players
AFC Bournemouth players
Tonbridge Angels F.C. players
English Football League players
North American Soccer League (1968–1984) players
English football managers
Brentford F.C. managers
England youth international footballers
English expatriate sportspeople in the United States
Expatriate soccer players in the United States
English expatriate footballers